Before the Dying of the Light  (Tifinagh: ⵓⵜⵔ ⴷⴻⵔⵜ ⵜⵉⴼⵔⵙ) is a 2020 documentary film directed and produced by Moroccan filmmaker Ali Essafi.

Synopsis 
The documentary chronicles the revolution of Moroccan avant-garde cinema in the 1970s under Hassan II's repressive reign, through a collage of archival footage, posters and magazine covers, jazz music, and animations.

Awards and accolades

References

External links 
 

2020 films
2020 documentary films